Simion Cuciuc (born July 4, 1941) is a Romanian sprint canoer who competed in the mid-1960s. He won a bronze medal in the K-4 1000 m event at the 1964 Summer Olympics in Tokyo.

References
 

1941 births
Canoeists at the 1964 Summer Olympics
Living people
Olympic canoeists of Romania
Olympic bronze medalists for Romania
Romanian male canoeists
Romanian people of Russian descent
Olympic medalists in canoeing
Medalists at the 1964 Summer Olympics